Peter Brocklehurst is an Australian singer and author.

Early years
Peter Brocklehurst is one of eight children. His family immigrated to Australia in the early 1960s. Brocklehurst grew up listening to Mario Lanza with dreams of becoming a classical singer. Brocklehurst never attended high school and had his innocence wrenched away when, as young children, he and his sister were abducted and abused for several days before being released.

He grew up fruit picking, repairing shoe and singing in cover bands.

In 1979, the Brocklehurst family settled in Warrnambool and Peter gained attention on the local music scene performing in south-west rock bands such as Limited Edition, Working Class Hero and Skyline.

At twenty-five years old Peter was working in a shoe repair business in Melbourne and fronting rock and roll cover bands.

Career
In 2003, Brocklehurst released his debut album, Boots + All.

Discography

Studio albums

Books
Finding My Voice (2004)

References

Living people
Australian male singers
Year of birth missing (living people)